Apple Jack or The Legend of Apple Jack is a 2003 American short film directed by Mark Whiting, and produced by Tranquility Pictures. The filming was performed on Sable Ranch, Canyon Country, California.

Premise
On October 30, 1938, UFO reports about sightings over the United States are heard on CBS radio, and members of a neighborhood gets ready to fight the incoming extraterrestrials. That same night, two notorious criminals run away and are never heard from again.

Cast
 Randy Travis - Narrator (voice)
 Sean Bridgers - Les Danyou
 Ron McCoy - Sherman Pyne
 Gene Dynarski - Helmut Jitters
 Walton Goggins - Moe Danyou
 Cole Sprouse - Jack Pyne
 Dylan Sprouse - Jack Pyne
 Orson Welles - (voice) (archive footage)
 Mark Whiting - Prison Guard (voice)

Awards
 Film Festival awards
 Won, L.A. Shorts Fest, 2003, (Mark Whiting)
 Won, Deep Ellum Film Festival, 2004, for Best Short Film (Mark Whiting)
 Won, Deep Ellum Film Festival, 2004, for Best Comedy Short (Mark Whiting)

External links
 Official MySpace page for Apple Jack
 
 New York Times article on Apple Jack

2003 films
2003 short films
2000s English-language films
Films about extraterrestrial life
Films set in 1938
2003 comedy films
American comedy short films
2000s American films